1390 Abastumani is a very large and dark background asteroid from the outer region of the asteroid belt. It was discovered on 3 October 1935, by Russian astronomer Pelageya Shajn at the Simeiz Observatory on the Crimean peninsula. It was named for the Georgian town of Abastumani.

Orbit and classification 

The dark and reddish asteroid is classified as a rare P-type asteroid in the Tholen taxonomic scheme, of which only a few dozens bodies are currently known. It orbits the Sun at a distance of 3.3–3.6 AU once every 6 years and 4 months (2,326 days). Its orbit has an eccentricity of 0.03 and an inclination of 20° with respect to the ecliptic. The first used precovery was taken at Lowell Observatory in 1929, extending the asteroid's observation arc by 6 years prior to its discovery.

Discovery 

Abastumani was discovered on 3 October 1935, by Soviet–Russian astronomer Pelageya Shajn at Simeiz Observatory on the Crimean peninsula. On the same night, the asteroid was independently discovered by South African astronomer Cyril Jackson at Johannesburg Observatory. It was one of the last large-sized bodies discovered in the outer belt (also see 1269 Rollandia and 1902 Shaposhnikov, discovered in 1930 and 1972, respectively).

Naming 

This minor planet is named after the spa town of Abastumani located in the Caucasus Mountains of Georgia. It is now the place where the Abastuman Astronomical Observatory  is situated. The official  was published by the Minor Planet Center in November 1952.

Physical characteristics 

In the Tholen classification, Abastumani is a primitive, carbonaceous P-type asteroid, a common spectral type in the outer main-belt and among the Jupiter trojan population.

Rotation period 
In April 2002, a rotational lightcurve of Abastumani was obtained from photometric observation by astronomer John Gross at the U.S. Sonoran Skies Observatory  in Benson, Arizona. It gave a rotation period of  hours with a brightness variation of 0.15 in magnitude.

Diameter and albedo 

According to the surveys carried out by the Infrared Astronomical Satellite IRAS, the Japanese Akari satellite, and the NEOWISE mission of NASA's Wide-field Infrared Survey Explorer, the asteroid measures between 98.3 and 107.8 kilometers in diameter, and its surface has a very low albedo between 0.026 and 0.033. The Collaborative Asteroid Lightcurve Link adopts the results obtained by IRAS, i.e. a diameter of 101.5 kilometers and an albedo of 0.0298.

References

External links 
 Lightcurve Database Query (LCDB), at www.minorplanet.info
 Dictionary of Minor Planet Names, Google books
 Asteroids and comets rotation curves, CdR – Geneva Observatory, Raoul Behrend
 Discovery Circumstances: Numbered Minor Planets (1)-(5000) – Minor Planet Center
 
 

001390
Discoveries by Pelageya Shajn
Named minor planets
001390
19351003